The Mac (known as Macintosh until 1999) is a family of personal computers designed and marketed by Apple Inc. Macs are particularly known for their ease of use and minimalist designs, and are popular among students, creative professionals, and software engineers. The product lineup includes the MacBook Air and MacBook Pro laptops, as well as the iMac, Mac Mini, Mac Studio and Mac Pro desktops. Macs run the macOS operating system.

The first Mac was released in 1984, and was advertised with the highly-acclaimed "1984" ad. After a period of initially being successful at first, the Mac subsequently languished in the 1990s until co-founder Steve Jobs returned to Apple in 1997 to reinvigorate it. After 1997, Jobs oversaw the release of many successful products, unveiled the modern Mac OS X, completed the 2005-06 Intel transition, and brought features from the iPhone back to the Mac. During Tim Cook's tenure as CEO, the Mac underwent a period of neglect, but was later reinvigorated with the introduction of popular high-end Macs and the ongoing Apple silicon transition, which brought the Mac to the same ARM architecture as iOS devices.

History

1979–1996: "Macintosh" era 

In the late 1970s, the Apple II was one of the most popular computers on the American market, especially in education. After IBM introduced the IBM PC in 1981, its sales quickly surpassed the Apple II; in response, Apple introduced the Apple Lisa in 1983. Though the Lisa's graphical user interface was partially inspired by the work of Xerox PARC, it also went far beyond PARC's prototypes, and introduced original innovations: the ability to drag-and-drop files, menu bars, and double-clicking. This was to no avail: hampered by its high $9,995 price and lack of available software, the Lisa was commercially unsuccessful.

Parallel to the Lisa's development, a skunkworks team at Apple was working on another project. Conceived in 1979 by Jef Raskin, the Macintosh was envisioned as an affordable, easy-to-use computer for the masses, with the Lisa's graphical interface. Raskin named the computer after his favorite type of apple, the McIntosh. The initial team consisted of Raskin, hardware engineer Burrell Smith, and Apple co-founder Steve Wozniak; Steve Jobs joined in 1981 after being removed from the Lisa team, and was able to gradually take control of the project due to Wozniak's temporary absence from the company following an airplane crash earlier that year.

Upon its 1984 release, the first Macintosh was described as a "revolution" by the New York Times. Sales initially met projections, but then sputtered as customers were polarized by its groundbreaking interface, and disappointed by the machine's poor performance and initial lack of applications. Most members of the original Macintosh team left Apple, and Jobs became publicly embroiled with CEO John Sculley; Jobs left to found NeXT. The first Macintosh nevertheless generated cult enthusiasm from buyers and some developers, who rushed to develop entirely new programs for the platform, including PageMaker, PowerPoint, and Excel. The Macintosh is credited with popularizing the graphical user interface. Reflecting Jobs' interest in typography, it came bundled with a variety of fonts. It was the first WYSIWYG computer, and due in large part to PageMaker and Apple's LaserWriter printer, it ignited the desktop publishing revolution, turning the Macintosh from an early let-down into a notable success.

In late 1985, Bill Atkinson, one of the few remaining members of the Macintosh team, embarked on a journey to create a Dynabook, Alan Kay's concept for a tablet computer that stores and organizes knowledge. Sculley rebuffed him, so he adapted the idea into a Mac program, HyperCard, whose "cards" could store any information — text, image, audio, video — with the memex-like ability to semantically link cards to each other. HyperCard was released in 1987 and bundled with every Macintosh.

In the late 1980s, Jean-Louis Gassée, a Sculley protégé who had succeeded Jobs as head of the Macintosh division, made the Mac more open and expandable to appeal to tech enthusiasts and make inroads in the enterprise market. This approach led to the successful 1989 release of the Macintosh II, which appealed to power users and gave the lineup momentum. However, this unwillingness to compromise on features foiled Apple's first laptop, the Macintosh Portable, which was almost as heavy as the original Macintosh and cost twice as much. The Mac Portable doomed Gassée, who was fired soon after its release.

Since the Mac's debut, Sculley had opposed lowering the company's profit margins, and Macintoshes were priced far above entry-level DOS computers, He also resisted licensing the Mac OS to competing hardware vendors, who could have undercut Apple on pricing and jeopardized its hardware sales, as IBM PC compatibles had done to IBM. These early strategic missteps caused the Macintosh to forever lose its chance at becoming the dominant personal computer platform. Though senior management demanded high-margin products, a few employees disobeyed and set out to create a computer that would live up to the original Macintosh's slogan: [a] computer for the rest of us", which the market clamored for. In a pattern typical of Apple's early era, this once-renegade project was endorsed by senior management following market pressures, and in 1990, the effort birthed the Macintosh LC and the affordable Macintosh Classic, the first model under $1,000. Between 1984 and 1989, Apple had sold one million Macs. It sold 10 million over the following five years.

In 1991, the Macintosh Portable was replaced with the smaller and lighter PowerBook 100, the first laptop to place a palm rest and trackball in front of the keyboard. The PowerBook brought a billion dollars of revenue within a year, and became a status symbol. By this point, the Macintosh represented 10% to 15% of the personal computer market. Fearing a decline in market share, Sculley decided to enter in an alliance with IBM and Motorola to create a new standardized computing platform, which led to the creation of the PowerPC processor architecture, and the failed Taligent operating system. After 1992, Apple pursued a more aggressive business strategy and flooded the market with Mac models targeting every niche. Michael Spindler continued this approach when he succeeded Sculley as CEO in 1993. He oversaw the Mac's transition from Motorola 68K to PowerPC and the release of Apple's first PowerPC machine, the well-received Power Macintosh.

Many new Macintoshes suffered from inventory and quality control problems. The 1995 PowerBook 5300 was plagued with quality problems; some units even caught fire, and the laptop was the subject of several recalls. Pessimistic about Apple's future, Spindler repeatedly attempted to sell Apple to other companies, including IBM, Kodak, AT&T, Sun, and Philips. In a last-ditch attempt to fend off Windows, Apple yielded and started a Macintosh clone program, which allowed other manufacturers to make computers that ran System 7; however, it only cannibalized the sales of Apple's higher-margin machines. Meanwhile, the far-superior Windows 95 was an instant hit with customers. Apple was struggling financially; its attempts to come up with a successor to the obsolete and unstable Mac OS — Taligent, Star Trek and Copland — had all failed, and its hardware was stagnant. The Mac was no longer competitive in the market place, and its sales entered a tailspin. Corporations abandoned the Macintosh platform in droves, replacing it with cheaper and more sophisticated Windows NT machines for which far more applications and peripherals existed; even Apple loyalists saw no future for the Macintosh. Once the world's second largest computer vendor after IBM, Apple's market share declined precipitously from 9.4% in 1993 to 3.1% in 1997. Bill Gates was ready to abandon Microsoft Office for Mac, which would have slashed any remaining business appeal the Mac had; Amelio tried to negotiate a deal with Gates, to no avail.

In 1996, Spindler was succeeded by Gil Amelio, who searched for an established operating system to acquire or license, which would form the foundation of a new Apple operating system. He considered BeOS, Solaris, Windows NT, and NeXT's NeXTSTEP, eventually choosing the latter. Apple acquired NeXT on December 20, 1996, and with it came its founder, Steve Jobs.

1997–2011: Steve Jobs era 
NeXT had developed the mature NeXTSTEP operating system, whose strengths lied in its multimedia and internet capabilities. NextSTEP was also popular among programmers, financial firms and academia for its object-oriented programming tools which allowed applications to be written far more rapidly. In an eagerly-anticipated speech at the January 1997 Macworld trade show, Steve Jobs previewed Rhapsody, a merger of NeXTSTEP and Mac OS which would be the foundation of Apple's new operating system strategy. At the time, Jobs only served in an advisory role, but became Apple's de facto CEO after Amelio was fired in July 1997. He was formally appointed interim CEO in September, and permanent CEO in January 2000  To turn the company around, Jobs streamlined Apple's operations and began layoffs. He negotiated a deal with Bill Gates: Microsoft committed to releasing new versions of Office for Mac for five years, investing $150 million in Apple, and settling an ongoing lawsuit in which Apple alleged that Windows had copied the Mac's interface. In exchange, Apple made Internet Explorer the default Mac browser. The deal was closed hours before Jobs announced it at the August 1997 Macworld.

Jobs brought focus back to Apple. The Mac lineup had been incomprehensible, with dozens of hard-to-distinguish models; he streamlined it into four quadrants, a laptop and a desktop each for consumers and professionals. Apple also discontinued several Mac accessories, including the StyleWriter printer and the Newton PDA. These changes were meant to refocus Apple's engineering, marketing and manufacturing efforts so that more care could be dedicated to each product. Jobs also stopped licensing Mac OS to clone manufacturers, which had cost Apple ten times more in lost sales than it received in licensing fees. Jobs made a deal with the largest computer reseller, CompUSA, to carry a "store within a store" that would better showcase Macs and their software and peripherals; according to Apple, the Mac's share of computer sales in those stores went from 3% to 14%. In November, the online Apple Store launched, which offered built-to-order Mac configurations without a middleman. When Tim Cook was hired as chief operations officer in March 1998, he shuttered Apple's inefficient factories and outsourced Mac production to Taiwan. Within months, he rolled out a new ERP system and implemented just-in-time manufacturing principles; this practically eliminated Apple's costly unsold inventory, and within a year, Apple had the most efficient inventory turnover in the industry. 

Jobs' top priority was "to ship a great new product". The first was the iMac G3, an all-in-one computer which was meant to make the Internet intuitive and easy to access. While PCs came in functional beige boxes, Jony Ive gave the iMac a radical and futuristic design, meant to make the product less intimidating: it was shaped like an egg, and its case was made of translucent plastic in "Bondi blue" color. Ive also added a handle on the back to make the computer more approachable. Meanwhile, Jobs decided the iMac would be "legacy-free", replacing the ADB and SCSI ports with an infrared port and the cutting-edge USB. He also controversially removed the floppy disk drive and replaced it with a CD drive. The iMac was unveiled in May 1998, and released in August. It was an immediate commercial success, and became the fastest-selling computer in Apple's history, with 800,000 units sold before the year ended. Vindicating Jobs on the Internet's appeal to consumers, 32% of iMac buyers had never used a computer before, and 12% were switching from PCs. The iMac reestablished the Mac's reputation as a trend-setter: for the next few years, translucent plastic became the dominant design trend in numerous consumer products.

Apple knew it had lost its chance to compete in the Windows-dominated enterprise market, so it prioritized design and ease of use to make the Mac more appealing to average consumers, and even teens. Apple also instituted a more collaborative product development process for the Mac, the "Apple New Product Process", which implemented concurrent engineering principles. From that point, the Mac would no longer be primarily crafted by engineers, with design as an afterthought. Instead, Ive and Jobs would first define a new product's "soul", before it was jointly developed by the marketing, engineering and operations teams. The engineering team was led by the product design group, and Ive's design studio was the dominant voice throughout the development process.

The next two Mac products in 1999, the Power Mac G3 (nicknamed "Blue and White") and the iBook, introduced industrial designs influenced by the iMac, incorporating colorful translucent plastic and carrying handles. The iBook introduced several innovations: it lacked a mechanical latch, instead relying on a strengthened hinge to keep it closed, its ports were located on the sides rather than on the back, and it was the first laptop with built-in Wi-Fi. It was best selling laptop in the U.S. during the fourth quarter of 1999. The professional-oriented Titanium PowerBook G4 was released in 2001, becoming the lightest and thinnest laptop in its class, and the first laptop with a wide-screen display; it also debuted a magnetic latch that secured the lid elegantly.

The design language of consumer Macs shifted again from colored plastics to white polycarbonate with the introduction of the 2001 Dual USB "Ice" iBook. In order to increase the iBook's durability, it did away with doors and handles, and gained a more minimalistic exterior. Ive attempted to go beyond the quadrant with Power Mac G4 Cube, an attempt to innovate beyond the computer tower and make a professional desktop that was far smaller than the Power Mac. The Cube failed in the market, and was withdrawn from sale after a year; however, Ive considered it beneficial, since it helped Apple gain experience in complex machining and miniaturization.

The development of a successor to the old Mac OS was well-underway. Rhapsody had been previewed at WWDC 1997, featuring a Mach kernel and BSD foundations, a virtualization layer for old Mac OS apps (codenamed Blue Box), and an implementation of NeXTSTEP APIs called OpenStep (codenamed Yellow Box). Apple open-sourced the core of Rhapsody as the Darwin operating system. After several developer previews, Apple also introduced the Carbon API, which provided a way for developers to more easily make their apps native to Mac OS X without rewriting them in Yellow Box. Mac OS X was publicly unveiled in January 2000, introducing the modern Aqua graphical user interface, and a far more stable Unix foundation, with memory protection and preemptive multitasking. Blue Box became the Classic environment, and Yellow Box was renamed Cocoa. Following a public beta, the first version of Mac OS X, version 10.0 Cheetah, was released in March 2001.

In 1999, Apple executives adopted a new strategy: the Mac would become a "digital hub", the centerpiece of the user's "digital lifestyle". Apple developed several software applications for Mac users as part of this strategy: in October 1999, the iMac DV gained FireWire, allowing users to connect camcorders and easily create movies with the iMovie application; the iMac also gained CD burning hardware, and in conjunction with the iTunes application, allowed users to rip CDs, make their own playlists, and burn them to blank discs. Other applications included iPhoto for organizing and editing photos, and GarageBand for creating and mixing music and other types of audio. Apple's digital hub strategy culminated in the company entering other markets, with the iTunes Store, iPod, iPhone, and iPad, and was reflected in a change in its name in 2007, from Apple Computer Inc to Apple Inc. By January 2007, the iPod came to represent half of Apple's revenues.

Apple continued to release new Mac models, such as the white "Sunflower" iMac G4; Ive designed a display that could swivel around and be moved with one) finger, so that it "appear[ed] to defy gravity. In 2003, Apple released the aluminum 12-inch and 17-inch PowerBook G4, proclaiming the "Year of the Notebook". With the Microsoft deal expiring, Apple also replaced Internet Explorer with its new browser, Safari. The first Mac Mini was intended to be assembled in the U.S., but domestic manufacturers were slow and had insufficient quality processes, leading Apple to choose Taiwanese manufacturer Foxconn instead. The affordably-priced Mac Mini desktop was introduced at Macworld 2005, alongside the introduction of the iWork office suite.

Intel transition and "back to the Mac" 
With PowerPC chips falling behind in performance, price, and efficiency, Steve Jobs announced in 2005 that all Macs would transition from PowerPC to Intel processors, revealing that Mac OS X had been adapted to run on both architectures since 2000. Users could keep running PowerPC apps using Rosetta, and even run Windows natively using Boot Camp. This transition helped contribute to a few years of growth in Mac sales.

After the iPhone's 2007 release, Apple began a multi-year effort to bring many iPhone innovations "back to the Mac", including multi-touch gesture support, instant wake from sleep, and fast flash storage. At Macworld 2008, Jobs introduced the first MacBook Air by taking it out of a manila envelope, touting it as the "world's thinnest notebook". The MacBook Air favored wireless technologies over physical ports, and lacked FireWire, an optical drive, or a replaceable battery. Users could access discs inserted into other computers on their local network through a feature called Remote Disc. A decade after its launch, journalist Tom Warren wrote that the MacBook Air had "immediately changed the future of laptops", starting the ultrabook trend. OS X Lion added new software features first introduced with the iPad, such as FaceTime, full-screen apps, document autosaving and versioning, and a bundled Mac App Store to replace software install discs with online downloads. It also gained support for Retina displays, which had been introduced earlier with the iPhone 4. iPhone-like multi-touch technology was progressively added to all MacBook trackpads, and to desktop Macs through the Magic Mouse, and Magic Trackpad. The 2010 MacBook Air added an iPad-inspired standby mode, "instant-on" wake from sleep, and flash memory for storage.

After criticism by Greenpeace, Apple improved the environmental friendliness of its Macs. The 2008 MacBook Air was free of toxic chemicals like mercury, bromide and PVC, and came in a smaller packaging. The enclosures of the iMac and unibody MacBook Pro were redesigned with more recyclable materials: aluminum and glass.

On February 24, 2011, the MacBook Pro became the first computer to support Intel's new Thunderbolt connector, which had two-way transfer speeds of 10Gbit/s, and was backward-compatible with Mini DisplayPort.

2012–present: Tim Cook era 

Following a period of deteriorating health, Steve Jobs resigned as CEO on August 24, 2011, and Tim Cook was named as his successor. Cook's first keynote address marked the release of iCloud, moving the "digital hub" from the Mac to the cloud. In 2012, the MacBook Pro was refreshed with a Retina display, while the iMac was slimmed and lost its SuperDrive.

During Cook's first few years as CEO, Apple fought back media criticisms that it could no longer innovate without Jobs. In 2013, Apple introduced a new cylindrical Mac Pro, with marketing chief Phil Schiller exclaiming "Can't innovate anymore, my ass!". The new model had a miniaturized design with a glossy dark gray cylindrical body and internal components organized around a central cooling system. Tech reviewers praised the 2013 Mac Pro for its power and futuristic design; however, it was poorly received by professional users, who criticized its lack of upgradability and the removal of expansion slots.

The iMac was refreshed with a 5K Retina display in 2014, making it the highest-resolution all-in-one desktop computer at the time of its release. The MacBook was reintroduced in 2015, with a completely redesigned aluminum unibody chassis, a 12-inch Retina display, a fanless low-power Intel Core M processor, a much smaller logic board, a new Butterfly keyboard, a single USB-C port, and a solid-state Force Touch trackpad with pressure sensitivity. It was praised for its portability, but criticized for its lack of performance, the need to use adapters to use most USB peripherals, and a high starting price of US$1,299. In 2015, Apple started a service program to address a widespread GPU defect in the 15-inch 2011 MacBook Pro, which could cause graphical artifacts or prevent the machine from functioning entirely.

Neglect of professional users 

The Touch Bar MacBook Pro was released in October 2016. It was the thinnest MacBook Pro ever made, replaced all ports with four Thunderbolt 3 (USB-C) ports, gained a thinner "Butterfly" keyboard, and replaced function keys with the Touch Bar. The Touch Bar was criticized for making it harder to use the function keys by feel, as it offered no tactile feedback. Many users were also frustrated by the need to buy dongles, particularly professional users who relied on traditional USB-A devices, SD cards, and HDMI for video output. A few months after its release, users reported a problem with stuck keys and letters being skipped or repeated. iFixit attributed this to the ingress of dust or food crumbs under the keys, jamming them. Since the Butterfly keyboard was riveted into the laptop's case, it could only be serviced at an Apple Store or authorized service center. Apple settled a $50m class-action lawsuit over these keyboards in 2022. These same models were afflicted by "flexgate": when users closed and opened the machine, they would risk progressively damaging the cable responsible for the display backlight, which was too short. The $6 cable was soldered to the screen, requiring a $700 repair.

Senior Vice President of Industrial Design Jony Ive continued to guide product designs towards simplicity and minimalism. Critics argued that he had begun to prioritize form over function, and was excessively focused on product thinness. His role in the decisions to switch to fragile Butterfly keyboards, to make the Mac Pro non-expandable, and to remove USB-A, HDMI and the SD card slot from the MacBook Pro were criticized.

The long-standing keyboard issue on MacBook Pros, Apple's abandonment of the Aperture professional photography app, and the lack of Mac Pro upgrades led to declining sales and a widespread belief that Apple was no longer committed to professional users. After several years without any significant updates to the Mac Pro, Apple executives admitted in 2017 that the 2013 Mac Pro had not met expectations, and said that the company had designed themselves into a "thermal corner", preventing them from releasing a planned dual-GPU successor. Apple also unveiled their future product roadmap for professional products, including plans for an iMac Pro as a stopgap and an expandable Mac Pro to be released later. The iMac Pro was revealed at WWDC 2017, featuring updated Intel Xeon W processors and Radeon Pro Vega graphics.

In 2018, Apple released a redesigned MacBook Air with a Retina display, Butterfly keyboard, Force Touch trackpad, and Thunderbolt 3 USB-C ports. The Butterfly keyboard went through three revisions, incorporating silicone gaskets in the key mechanism to prevent keys from being jammed by dust or other particles. However, many users continued to experience reliability issues with these keyboards, leading Apple to launch a program to repair affected keyboards free of charge. Higher-end models of the 15-inch 2018 MacBook Pro faced another issue where the Core i9 processor reached unusually high temperatures, resulting in reduced CPU performance from thermal throttling. Apple issued a patch to address this issue via a macOS supplemental update, blaming a "missing digital key" in the thermal management firmware.

The 2019 MacBook Air and 2020 MacBook Pro replaced the unreliable Butterfly keyboard with a redesigned scissor-switch Magic Keyboard. On the MacBook Pros, the Touch Bar and Touch ID were made standard, and the Esc key was detached from the Touch Bar and returned to being a physical key. At WWDC 2019, Apple unveiled a new Mac Pro with a larger case design that allows for hardware expandability, as well as introducing a new expansion module system (MPX), for modules such as an optional Afterburner card for faster video encoding. Almost every part of the new Mac Pro is user-replaceable, with iFixit praising its high user-repairability. It received positive reviews, with reviewers praising its power, modularity, quiet cooling, and Apple's increased focus on professional workflows.

Apple silicon transition 
In April 2018, Bloomberg reported that Apple was planning to replace Intel chips with ARM processors similar to those used in its phones, causing Intel's shares to drop by 9.2%. The Verge, commenting on the rumors, stated that such a decision made sense, as Intel was failing to make significant improvements to its processors, and could not compete with ARM chips on battery life.

At WWDC 2020, Tim Cook announced that the Mac would be transitioning to Apple silicon chips, built upon an ARM architecture, over a two-year timeline. The Rosetta 2 translation layer was also introduced, enabling Apple silicon Macs to run Intel apps. On November 10, 2020, Apple announced their first system-on-a-chip designed for the Mac, the Apple M1, and a series of Macs that would ship with the M1: the MacBook Air, Mac Mini, and the 13-inch MacBook Pro. These new Macs received highly positive reviews, with reviewers highlighting significant improvements in battery life, performance, and heat management compared to previous generations.

The iMac Pro was quietly discontinued on March 6, 2021. On April 20, 2021, a new 24-inch iMac was revealed, featuring the M1 chip, seven new colors, thinner white bezels, and an enclosure made entirely from recycled aluminum. On October 18, 2021, Apple announced new 14-inch and 16-inch MacBook Pros featuring a bezel-less mini-LED 120 Hz ProMotion display, and the return of a MagSafe, HDMI port, and SD card slot.

On March 8, 2022, the Mac Studio was unveiled, featuring more powerful M1 Max and M1 Ultra chips in a similar form factor to the Mac Mini. It drew highly positive reviews for its flexibility and wide range of available ports. Its performance was deemed "impressive", beating the highest-end Mac Pro with a 28-core Intel Xeon chip, while being significantly more power efficient and compact. It was introduced alongside the Studio Display, and was meant to replace the 27-inch iMac, which was discontinued on the same day. At WWDC 2022, Apple announced an updated MacBook Air based on a new M2 chip. It incorporates several changes from the 14-inch MacBook Pro, such as a flat, slab-shaped design, full-sized function keys, MagSafe charging, and a Liquid Retina display, with rounded corners and a notch incorporating a 1080p webcam.

Product lineup

Marketing 

The original Macintosh was marketed at Super Bowl XVIII with the highly-acclaimed "1984" ad, directed by Ridley Scott. The ad alluded to George Orwell's novel Nineteen Eighty-Four, and symbolized Apple's desire to "rescue" humanity from the conformity of computer industry giant IBM. The ad is now considered a "watershed event" and a "masterpiece." Before the Macintosh, high-tech marketing catered to industry insiders rather than consumers, and as a result, journalists covered technology like the "steel or automobiles" industries, with articles written for a highly technical audience. The Macintosh launch event pioneered event marketing techniques that have since become "widely emulated" in Silicon Valley, by creating a mystique about the product and giving an inside look into its creation. Apple also took a new "multiple exclusives" approach regarding the press, giving "over one hundred interviews to journalists that lasted over six hours apiece", and introduced a new "Test Drive a Macintosh" campaign.

Apple's brand, which established a "heartfelt connection with consumers", is cited as one of the keys to the Mac's success. After Steve Jobs's return to the company, he unveiled the Think different ad campaign, positioning the Mac as the best computer for "creative people who believe that one person can change the world". The campaign featured black-and-white photographs of luminaries like Albert Einstein, Gandhi, and Martin Luther King Jr., with Jobs saying: "if they ever used a computer, it would have been a Mac." The ad campaign was critically acclaimed and won several awards, including a Primetime Emmy. In the 2000s, Apple continued to use successful marketing campaigns to promote the Mac line, including the Switch and Get a Mac campaigns.

Apple's focus on design and build quality has helped establish the Mac as a high-end, premium brand. The company's emphasis on creating iconic and visually appealing designs for its computers has given them a "human face" and made them stand out in a crowded market. Apple has long made use of product placements in high-profile movies and television shows to showcase Mac computers, like Mission: Impossible, Legally Blonde, and Sex and the City. Apple is known for not allowing producers to show villains using Apple products. Its own shows produced for the Apple TV+ streaming service also feature prominent use of MacBooks.

The Mac is known for having a highly loyal customer base. In 2022, the American Customer Satisfaction Index gave the Mac the highest customer satisfaction score of any personal computer, at 82 out of 100. At of that same year, Apple is the fourth largest vendor of personal computers, with a market share of 8.9%.

Hardware 

Apple outsources the production of its hardware to Asian manufacturers like Foxconn and Pegatron, maintaining a high degree of control over the end-product. As a highly vertically integrated company, Apple produces its own operating system and designs its own chips, allowing for tight control over all aspects of its products and deeper integration between hardware and software.

All Macs in production use ARM-based Apple silicon processors, except the Mac Pro. Apple silicon Macs have been praised for their performance and power efficiency. They can run Intel apps through the Rosetta 2 translation layer, as well as iOS and iPadOS apps distributed via the App Store. These Mac models come equipped with high-speed Thunderbolt 4 or USB 4 connectivity, with speeds up to 40Gbit/s. Apple silicon Macs have custom integrated graphics rather than graphics cards. MacBooks are recharged with either USB-C or MagSafe connectors, depending on the model.

Apple offers a range of accessories for the Mac, including the Studio Display and Pro Display XDR external monitors, the AirPods line of wireless headphones, and keyboards and mice such as the Magic Keyboard, Magic Trackpad, and Magic Mouse.

Software 

Macs run the macOS operating system, which is the second most widely used desktop OS, after Microsoft Windows and ahead of ChromeOS.

macOS is the successor of the classic Mac OS, which saw nine releases between 1984 and 1999. The latest version of Classic Mac OS, Mac OS 9, was introduced in 1999, and still evokes nostalgia for some users, part of a trend known as retrocomputing. Mac OS 9 was succeeded by Mac OS X in 2001. Over the years, Mac OS X was rebranded to OS X, and is now known as macOS.

macOS is a derivative of NextSTEP and FreeBSD. It uses the XNU kernel, and the core of macOS has been open-sourced as the Darwin operating system. macOS features the Aqua user interface, the Cocoa set of frameworks, and the Objective-C and Swift programming languages. Macs are deeply integrated with other Apple devices, including the iPhone and iPad, through Continuity features like Handoff, Sidecar, Universal Control, and Universal Clipboard.

The first version of Mac OS X, version 10.0, was released in March 2001. Subsequent major releases each introduce major changes and features to the operating system. 10.4 "Tiger" added Spotlight search; 10.6 "Snow Leopard" brought refinements, stability, and full 64-bit support; 10.7 "Lion" introduced many iPad-inspired features; 10.10 "Yosemite" introduced a complete user interface revamp, replacing skeuomorphic designs with iOS 7-esque flat designs; 10.12 "Sierra" added the Siri voice assistant and Apple File System (APFS) support; 10.14 "Mojave" added a dark user interface mode; 11 "Big Sur" introduced an iOS-inspired redesign of the user interface.

The Mac has a wide variety of apps available, including cross-platform apps like Google Chrome, Microsoft Office, Adobe Creative Cloud, Mathematica, Visual Studio Code, Ableton Live, and Cinema 4D. Apple has also developed several apps for the Mac, including Final Cut Pro, Logic Pro, iWork, GarageBand, and iMovie. A large amount of open-source software applications run natively on macOS, like LibreOffice, GIMP, and VLC, as well as command-line programs, which can be installed through Homebrew. Many applications written for Linux or BSD also run on macOS, often using X11. Apple's official integrated development environment (IDE) is Xcode, allowing developers to create apps for the Mac and other Apple platforms.

The latest release of macOS is 13 "Ventura", which launched on October 24, 2022.

Timeline

Notes

References

Books

Print

Further reading

External links 

 

 Macintosh computer
Computer-related introductions in 1984
 
Apple computers
Steve Jobs